Ons Jabeur was the defending champion, having won the event in 2013, but chose to compete at the $25,000 ITF tournament in Tunis.

Naomi Broady won the title, defeating Kristýna Plíšková in the final, 5–7, 6–3, 6–4.

Seeds

Main draw

Finals

Top half

Bottom half

References 
 Main draw

Fukuoka International Women's Cup - Singles
Fukuoka International Women's Cup